Electronic signage (also called electronic signs or electronic displays) are illuminant advertising media in the signage industry. Major electronic signage include fluorescent signs, HID (high intensity displays), incandescent signs, LED signs, and neon signs. Besides, LED signs and HID are so-called digital signage.

Status
Electronic signs may be used indoors or outdoors. The display technologies are varied and changing quickly. Because of new display technologies, electronic signs are able to present more clear, colorful, and vivid images. Animated electronic signs gradually replace traditional static signs and increasingly take signage market share.

Average percentage of various signs usage

Regulation (USA)

It is not difficult to have an electronic sign for your business; however, it is not simple to get a permit to install an electronic sign. There are two terms for the advertising industry, off-premises advertising device and on-premises advertising device. Usually, there are different regulatory and zoning set up by different cities for different types of advertising media.

Results of State Statutory Review 

Note: 10 states prohibit animation or moving parts except for public service announcement

Gallery

See also
 Advertising
 Billboard
 Digital signage
 Destination sign (used in public transport vehicles)
 Signage
 Out-of-home advertising

References

External links
  International Sign Association

Signage
Cyberpunk themes
Advertising tools
Advertising by medium